Clannad is the debut album by Irish folk group Clannad. It was released in 1973 by Philips Ireland. It was reissued in 1982 under the name The Pretty Maid. In 1997, it was released on CD for the first time by Royal Records International again under the name Clannad, with a bonus track from 1975.  The album features songs in both Irish Gaelic and English, including a cover version of Bonnie Dobson's "Morning Dew", as well as many traditional Irish songs.

Track listing
All tracks Traditional; except where indicated 
 "Níl Sé Ina Lá (Níl Sé'n Lá)" – 4:50
 "Thíos Cois na Trá Domh" – 2:55
 "Brian Boru's March" – 3:50
 "Siúbhán Ní Dhuibhir" – 4:30
 "An Mhaighdean Mhara" – 2:10
 "Liza" (Padraig Duggan, Pól Brennan) – 2:00
 "An tOileán Úr" – 4:03
 "Mrs. McDermott" (Turlough O'Carolan) – 3:03
 "The Pretty Maid" – 2:40
 "An Pháirc" (Mick Hanly) – 3:00
 "Harvest Home" – 1:40
 "Morning Dew" (Bonnie Dobson, Tim Rose) – 3:45

Bonus Track
 "An Bealach Seo 'tá Romham" – 2:42

External links

1973 debut albums
Clannad albums